Sebastián Alberto López (born 15 September 1985) is an Argentine footballer who plays as a goalkeeper for Deportes Temuco.

Honours

Club
Banfield
 Primera División (1): 2009 Clausura

Deportes Antofagasta
 Primera B (1): 2011

References

External links
 

1985 births
Living people
People from San Nicolás de los Arroyos
Argentine footballers
Argentine expatriate footballers
Club Atlético Banfield footballers
C.D. Antofagasta footballers
Deportes Temuco footballers
Uniautónoma F.C. footballers
Jaguares de Córdoba footballers
Cobresal footballers
Lautaro de Buin footballers
Santiago Morning footballers
Argentine Primera División players
Primera B de Chile players
Chilean Primera División players
Categoría Primera A players
Argentine expatriate sportspeople in Chile
Expatriate footballers in Chile
Argentine expatriate sportspeople in Colombia
Expatriate footballers in Colombia
Association football goalkeepers
Sportspeople from Buenos Aires Province